Plantain soup is eaten in various cuisines. In Colombian cuisine, the dish is known as sopa de patacón (fried plantain). There is also sopa de platanos (plantain soup) in Latin American cuisine including Cuban cuisine and Puerto Rican cuisine.

Caldo de bolas de verde (green plantain dumpling soup) is from coastal Ecuador. The dumplings (balls) are made from green plantains stuffed with meat and vegetables. The beef broth includes corn and yuca.

Aguají is a rustic Dominican plantain soup.

Mohinga is a Burmese soup made with banana/plantain stem.

In Puerto Rico the soup is called sopa de plátano (plantain soup) and crema de plátano (plantain cream). The soup is made with a ratio of three green plantain to one yellow plantain. The plantains are cooked in sofrito, spices, broth, and milk. When the plantains are cooked it is then pureed. The soup is similar in texture and appearance to chowder and cream soup. It is eaten with sherred cheese on top. Mofongo is popular fried plantain dumpling stuffed with meat, spices, and vegetables and eaten in chicken broth.

See also
 List of soups
 Mofongo

References

Plantain dishes
Latin American cuisine
Colombian soups
Ecuadorian soups
Cuban soups
Puerto Rican soups
Dominican Republic cuisine